The Superconductor Insulator Transition is an example of a quantum phase transition, whereupon tuning some parameter in the Hamiltonian, a dramatic change in the behavior of the electrons occurs. The nature of how this transition occurs is disputed, and many studies seek to understand how the order parameter, changes. Most theories involve either the destruction of the amplitude of the order parameter - by a reduction in the density of states at the Fermi surface, or by destruction of the phase coherence; which results from the proliferation of vortices.

Destruction of superconductivity
In two dimensions, the subject of superconductivity becomes very interesting because the existence of true long-range order is not possible. How then is superconductivity obtained?  In the 70's, Kosterlitz and Thouless (along with Berezinski) showed that a different kind of long-range order could exist - topological order - which showed power law correlations (meaning that by measuring the two-point correlation function  it decays algebraically).

This picture changes if disorder is included. Kosterlitz-Thouless behavior can be obtained, but the fluctuations of the order parameter are greatly enhanced, and the transition temperature is suppressed.

The model to keep in mind in the understanding of how superconductivity occurs in a two-dimensional disordered superconductor is the following. At high temperatures, the system is in the normal state. As the system is cooled towards its transition temperature, superconducting grains begin to fluctuate in and out of existence. When one of these grains "pops" into existence, it is accelerated without dissipation for a time  before decaying back into the normal state. This has the effect of increasing the conductivity even before the system has condensed into the superconducting state. This increased conductivity above  is referred to as paraconductivity, or fluctuation conductivity, and was first correctly described by Aslamazov and Larkin. As the system is cooled further, the lifetime of these fluctuations increase, and becomes comparable to the Ginzburg-Landau time . Eventually, the amplitude  of the order parameter becomes well defined (it is non-zero wherever there are superconducting patches), and it can begin to support phase fluctuations. These phase fluctuations set in at a lower temperature, and are caused by vortices - which are topological defects in the order parameter. It is the motion of vortices that gives rise to inflation of resistance below . Eventually the system is cooled further, below the Kosterlitz-Thouless temperature , all of the free vortices become bound into vortex-antivortex pairs, and the systems attains a state with zero resistance.

Finite magnetic field
For very small fields the magnetic field is shielded from the interior of the sample. Above  however, the energy cost to keep out the external field becomes too great, and the superconductor allows the field to penetrate in quantized fluxons. Now the superconductor has transitioned into the "mixed state", in which there is a superfluid along with vortices - which now have only one circulation.

Increasing the field adds vortices to the system. Eventually the density of vortices becomes so large that they overlap. The core of the vortex contains normal electrons (i.e. the amplitude of the superconducting order parameter is zero), so when they overlap, superconductivity is killed by destroying the amplitude of the order parameter. Increasing the field further leads to a very interesting possibility - in two-dimensions where the fluctuations are enhanced - that the vortices may condense into a Bose-condensate, which localizes the superconducting pairs.

See also
Metal–insulator transition
Anderson's theorem

References

 
 

Superconductivity
Quantum phases